
Gmina Bądkowo is a rural gmina (administrative district) in Aleksandrów County, Kuyavian-Pomeranian Voivodeship, in north-central Poland.

Villages
Gmina Bądkowo contains the villages of Antoniewo, Bądkówek, Bądkowo, Biele, Jaranowo, Kalinowiec, Kolonia Łowiczek, Kryńsk, Kujawka, Kwiatkowo, Łowiczek, Łówkowice, Sinki, Słupy Duże, Słupy Małe, Tomaszewo, Toporzyszczewo, Wójtówka, Wysocin, Żabieniec and Zieleniec.

Neighbouring gminas
Gmina Bądkowo is bordered by the gminas of Brześć Kujawski, Koneck, Lubanie, Osięciny, Waganiec and Zakrzewo.

References
Polish official population figures 2006

Badkowo
Aleksandrów County